Ivan Terenine (Russian: Иван Теренин; born 22 June 1982) is a Russian former cyclist.

Major results

2001
 1st Overall Five Rings of Moscow
2002
 1st Overall Mainfranken-Tour
1st Stage 1
2003
 1st Overall Tour du Cameroun
 1st Stage 3 Criterium des Espoirs
 1st Stage 3 Triptyque des Monts et Châteaux
2004
 1st Overall Five Rings of Moscow
2005
 1st Mayor Cup
 1st Stage 2 Five Rings of Moscow

References

1982 births
Living people
Russian male cyclists